Miroslav Klásek (8 February 1913 – 18 June 1976) was a Czech athlete. He competed in the men's pole vault at the 1936 Summer Olympics. Immediately prior to this, Klásek set a new national record in the event, which gained him selection for the Olympics.

References

External links
 

1913 births
1976 deaths
Athletes (track and field) at the 1936 Summer Olympics
Czech male pole vaulters
Olympic athletes of Czechoslovakia
Place of birth missing